Saudi Arabia made its Paralympic Games début at the 1996 Summer Paralympics in Atlanta, with two competitors in powerlifting. The country has participated in every subsequent edition of the Summer Paralympics, but has never entered the Winter Paralympics. All Saudis have competed in athletics or powerlifting.

Saudi Arabia has won a total of four medals, two through Osamah Alshanqiti in 2008. Alshanqiti was the Kingdom's first Paralympic champion when he set a world record of 15.37m in the triple jump, F12 category. His other medal was a silver in the long jump, with a result of 7.06m, behind South Africa's Hilton Langenhoven (7.31m). The other two medals belong to Hani Alnakhli, with a silver in 2012 and a bronze in 2016.

Saudi Arabia has only ever sent male athletes to compete in the Paralympics, as women in the country are barred from taking part in international sports events. There has reportedly been some pressure on the country to allow women competitors for the 2012 Games, but when a delegation of Saudi Arabia's Disabled Sports Federation Powerlifting Team visited the facilities for the London Games in 2009, its athletes were all men.

Medal tables

Medals by Summer Games

Medals by Summer sport

Medalists

See also
 Saudi Arabia at the Olympics
 Saudi Arabia at the Deaflympics

References